The Grandmothers is a 1927 novel by Glenway Wescott which received the Harper Novel Prize. Based upon Wescott's own life and family, it is told through the eyes of young Alwyn Tower who leaves the farm to live in Europe, but who remains haunted by his long-dead family members – grandparents, great-uncles and aunts, whose lives were shattered by the Civil War. Each chapter is devoted to a different family member. Written in a lyrical, poetic style, it is Wescott's most enduring work.

Editions
The Grandmothers, a Family Portrait, Harper & Brothers (1927)
...with an introduction by Fred B. Millett, Harper & Brothers (1950)
...with an introduction by John W. Aldridge, Arbor House (1986)  
...with an introduction by Sargent Bush, Jr., University of Wisconsin Press (1996)

References

External links
 Full text of The Grandmothers (first edition) at the Internet Archive

1927 American novels